John (died 1184×1186) was the chancellor of the Principality of Antioch from 1177 until 1183 and the bishop of Tripoli from 1183 until 1184. He was the archdeacon of the Patriarchate of Antioch during his time as chancellor before he became bishop. His appointment to the bishopric may have been intended as a reward for his years of service, but it may also indicate that he did not wish to serve Prince Bohemond III after the latter's conflict with Patriarch Aimery of Limoges. John briefly held the chancellorship and bishopric simultaneously—signing a charter of Bohemond III in May 1183—but soon relinquished it. He was succeeded as chancellor by Archbishop Albert of Tarsus, who was in office by 1184. He was succeeded as bishop by Aimery by 1186 at the latest.

References

1180s deaths
12th-century Roman Catholic bishops in the Kingdom of Jerusalem
People of the Crusader states